Kenzy Ayman (born 18 March 2004 in Cairo) is an Egyptian professional squash player. As of May 2022, she was ranked number 79 in the world.

References

2004 births
Living people
Egyptian female squash players
21st-century Egyptian women